Keriri Island is a rural locality in the Torres Strait Island Region, Queensland, Australia.

Geography 
Hammond Island is the town on the east coast of the island.

Bruce Point is a headland just south of the town. There are boat launching facilities there.

History
Keriri Island was named as a locality on 2 July 2010.

Hammond Island was probably named after naval office Sir Andrew Snape Hamond by Captain Edward Edwards on September 1791 while travelling to Timor in the boats after the wreck of HMS Pandora.

Bruce Point was named after Robert Gerald Bruce, who worked as a pilot from 1922 to 1964 in the Torres Strait. Following his death 1973, his cremated ashes were scattered at this point.

Education 
Our Lady of the Sacred Heart School is a private primary (Prep-3) campus at Lot 11 Church Street of Our Lady of the Sacred Heart School headquartered at Thursday Island. Older children take the daily ferry to Thursday Island to attend the main school there.

There are no government schools on Keriri Island. However, there are government primary and secondary schools on neighbouring Thursday Island.

References 

Torres Strait Island Region
Localities in Queensland